Arthur Morgan may refer to:
 Arthur Morgan (Australian politician, born 1856) (1856–1916), Premier of Queensland, Australia
 Arthur Ernest Morgan (1878–1975), American administrator, educator and engineer
 Arthur Morgan (Australian politician, born 1881) (1881–1957), member for Darling Downs in the Australian Parliament, 1929–1931
 Arthur Eustace Morgan (1886–1972), British professor of English and principal of University College Hull and McGill University
 Arthur C. Morgan (1904–1994), American sculptor
 Tony Morgan (sailor) or Arthur William Crawford Morgan (born 1931), British Olympic sailor
 Arthur Morgan (Irish politician) (born 1954), Irish Sinn Féin politician and  Teachta Dála for Louth, 2002–2011
 Arthur Morgan (Red Dead), the main protagonist in Red Dead Redemption 2